Illerbrun is an unincorporated community within the Rural Municipality of Bone Creek No. 108, Saskatchewan, Canada. Located approximately 10 km east of Highway 37, 92.5 km southwest of Swift Current.

See also

 List of communities in Saskatchewan

References

Bone Creek No. 108, Saskatchewan
Unincorporated communities in Saskatchewan
Division No. 4, Saskatchewan